Joe Denim (born Joel Brentlinger on December 19, 1974) is an American comedian, singer, songwriter, personality, and host who co-wrote the hit song "Pray for You" by Jaron & the Long Road to Love in 2009 which reached the Top 15 on the Billboard Hot Country Songs charts.

References

American male songwriters
Living people
1974 births
21st-century American comedians